Robbie Fox (born 16 April 1993) is a professional Australian rules footballer playing for the Sydney Swans in the Australian Football League (AFL).

Early career
Originally from Tasmania, Fox concentrated on basketball as a junior making the state's U16 and U20 teams. He was still playing football on Saturday afternoon with the Burnie Dockers. Deciding to have a decent crack at football he moved to Victoria and joined VFL club Coburg. He spent two years building his fitness, and it paid dividends for the mature-age prospect. He was drafted by Sydney with their second selection and thirty-fourth overall in the 2017 rookie draft.

AFL career

Fox is capable of playing as a defender or shifting forward to kick a goal. He is one of the best endurance runners at the club and can take a strong contested grab. He played 11 senior matches in 2019. The versatile Fox was delisted after playing 14 games in the 2020 season, but has since been pre-listed by the Sydney Swans as a category A rookie for the 2021 AFL season. He achieved career highs in the 2022 Sydney season, particularly with his exceptional disposal. His 2022 is largely considered his best by some amount with his ability to play small, tall or rebound the ball in defence.

Statistics
Updated to the end of the 2022 season.

|-
| 2017 ||  || 42
| 3 || 1 || 0 || 14 || 25 || 39 || 1 || 15 || 0.3 || 0.0 || 4.7 || 8.3 || 13.0 || 0.3 || 5.0
|- 
| 2018 ||  || 42
| 10 || 4 || 2 || 54 || 52 || 106 || 25 || 27 || 0.4 || 0.2 || 5.4 || 5.2 || 10.6 || 2.5 || 2.7
|-
| 2019 ||  || 42
| 11 || 3 || 1 || 65 || 63 || 128 || 25 || 47 || 0.3 || 0.1 || 5.9 || 5.7 || 11.6 || 2.3 || 4.3
|- 
| 2020 ||  || 42
| 14 || 0 || 0 || 86 || 58 || 144 || 30 || 37 || 0.0 || 0.0 || 6.1 || 4.1 || 10.3 || 2.1 || 2.6
|-
| 2021 ||  || 42
| 15 || 0 || 0 || 95 || 87 || 182 || 40 || 28 || 0.0 || 0.0 || 6.3 || 5.8 || 12.1 || 2.7 || 1.9
|- 
| 2022 ||  || 42
| 14 || 0 || 1 || 155 || 86 || 241 || 75 || 29 || 0.0 || 0.1 || 11.1 || 6.1 || 17.2 || 5.4 || 2.1
|- class=sortbottom
! colspan=3 | Career
! 67 !! 8 !! 4 !! 469 !! 371 !! 840 !! 196 !! 183 !! 0.1 !! 0.1 !! 7.0 !! 5.5 !! 12.5 !! 2.9 !! 2.7
|}

References

External links

1993 births
Living people
Sydney Swans players
Coburg Football Club players
Australian rules footballers from Tasmania
Burnie Dockers Football Club players